Margrét Þóra Hallgrímsson (28 January 1930 – 27 August 2020), also referred as Thora Hallgrimsdottir, was an Icelandic socialite and aristocrat who was the wife of the businessman Björgólfur Guðmundsson and like him was a prominent figure in the cultural and business life of Iceland from around 2002 to 2008. She was also the former wife of American Nazi Party founder George Lincoln Rockwell.

Family and surname

Þóra was born in Reykjavík, the eldest daughter of Hallgrímur Fr. Hallgrímsson, chairman of Royal Dutch Shell in Iceland and consul in Canada, and his wife Margrét Þorbjörg Thors Hallgrímsson, daughter of the businessman Thor Philip Axel Jensen.

Although ethnically Icelandic, Þóra's father Hallgrímur was born in Canada. His surname Hallgrímsson is in fact his father's patronym, which his father had taken as a surname when moving to Canada. In turn, Þóra also inherited the surname, giving rise to the unusual situation of a female Icelander with a last name ending in -son (see Icelandic name).

At 14, Þóra was sent to boarding school in the UK.

Marriages

While studying in England, Þóra received a marriage proposal from David Tomlinson, whereupon her father had her return to Iceland, via a spell studying in the USA. Once in Iceland, Þóra met Haukur Clausen, an Olympic athlete and later dentist, and married him on 6 January 1951. Together they had Örn Friðrik (born 13 July 1951), but they separated just a year later due to Clausen having an affair with Þóra's best friend.

On 3 October 1953 Þóra married George Lincoln Rockwell, an officer in the U.S. Navy and later founder of the American Nazi Party, moving with him to America. With him she had three further children: Hallgrímur, Margrét, and Evelyn Bentína. In Roger Boyes's account,

Olafur Thors’s niece Thora Hallgrimsdottir was in trouble. Thora was a free spirit. At a ball in Reykjavik she had fallen for a handsome American naval Officer, George Lincoln Rockwell—a war hero to boot—and abandoned her marriage to a well-connected Icelandic dentist to wed him. All harmless enough, except that Rockwell became a founder of the American Nazi Party and one of the most active racists in the United States. One of his missions was to take the Ku Klux Klan into the modern age; he coined the phrase "White Power", organized rallies, and operated a Hate Bus to stir up sentiment against African-Americans.

Accounts of Þóra's divorce from Rockwell, which include Rockwell's own autobiography, and her return to Iceland vary. Her father Hallgrímur travelled to the United States in 1958 to bring his daughter home; according to Boyes, the family asked Björgólfur Guðmundsson to help convince Þóra to return to Iceland,  but according to her son Björgólfur Thor, Þóra met Björgólfur Guðmundsson back in Iceland. Either way, Þóra moved back with her four children, divorced Rockwell, and in 1963 married Björgólfur. She had one son by Björgólfur, Björgólfur Thor Björgólfsson, but Björgólfur Guðmundsson also adopted Þóra's children by Rockwell.

Þóra's grandson, by her daughter Evelyn Bentína Björgólfsdóttir, is the footballer Björgólfur Hideaki Takefusa.

Controversy over biography

In 2005, Guðmundur Magnússon published the book Thorsararnir, on the history of the descendants of Thor Jensen. In the first version of the book was a chapter on Þóra's marriage with Rockwell. The book was published by the press Edda, but Björgólfur, who owned the publisher, had the author change the text. Moreover, he tried to buy the newspaper Dagblaðið-Vísir, which had discussed the matter, in order to close it down.

Appearances in popular culture 

Þóra was the model for the character Lilja Jónsdóttir in the novel Sakleysingjarnir by Ólaf Jóhann Ólafsson.

References

External links
This Time The World, autobiography of George Lincoln Rockwell.

Margret Thora Hallgrímsson
Margret Thora Hallgrímsson
2020 deaths
1930 births
Margret Thora Hallgrímsson
Margret Thora Hallgrímsson
Thors family